Baked milk is a variety of boiled milk that has been particularly popular in Russia, Ukraine and Belarus. It is made by simmering milk on low heat for eight hours or longer.

History 
Baked milk was relatively popular outside of Russia as well. It was judged as more palatable than boiled milk and was described in medical literature as probably more digestible. The most simple recipe suggested by 19th-century cookbooks for producing baked milk was just leaving milk in an oven overnight; more elaborate recipes could have been found as well.

In rural areas, baked milk has been produced by leaving a jug of boiled milk in an oven for a day or for a night until it is coated with a brown crust. Prolonged exposure to heat causes reactions between the milk's amino acids and sugars, resulting in the formation of melanoidin compounds that give it a creamy color and caramel flavor. A great deal of moisture evaporates, resulting in a change of consistency. The stove in a traditional Russian loghouse (izba) sustains "varying cooking temperatures based on the placement of the food inside the oven".

Today, baked milk is produced on an industrial scale. Like scalded milk, it is free of bacteria and enzymes and can be stored safely at room temperature for up to forty hours. Home-made baked milk is used for preparing a range of cakes, pies, and cookies.

Long term consuming of baked milk may help for resolution of milk allergy. However, in some cases, acquired tolerance reverts back to unresolved allergy.

Fermented baked milk 
Ryazhenka and varenets are fermented baked milk products, a sort of traditional yoghurt. It is a common breakfast drink in Ukraine, Belarus, and Russia.

In peasant communities, the varenets has been made in the traditional East Slavic oven by "baking sour milk to a golden brown color". In the Soviet era, the name "ryazhenka" came to be applied to the government-produced creme-colored drink without the skin.

See also
 Caramelized sweetened condensed milk, or dulce de leche, is a similar preparation used in home-made pastries, often prepared by prolonged heating of unopened cans of condensed milk.
 List of baked goods

References

External links

Milk-based drinks
Russian dairy products
Russian drinks
Ukrainian cuisine
Belarusian cuisine
Milk